Kayla is a village in Bhiwani tehsil, Bhiwani district, of the Indian state of Haryana.  the 2011 Census of India, it had a population of 4,052 across 738 households.

See also 
 List of villages in Bhiwani district

References 

Villages in Bhiwani district